A Surface Effect Ship (SES) or Sidewall Hovercraft is a watercraft that has both an air cushion, like a hovercraft, and twin hulls, like a catamaran. When the air cushion is in use, a small portion of the twin hulls remains in the water. When the air cushion is turned off ("off-cushion" or "hull borne"), the full weight of the vessel is supported by the buoyancy of the twin hulls.

The SES has two advantages over a hovercraft for open sea operation: it is more resistant to slipping sideways when acted on by air or sea, and it can use water jets for propulsion since the inlet nozzles are always covered by water.

History

United States Navy 
The United States Navy initiated the SES model test program in 1960. By 1963, a 10-ton test craft called the XR-1 was designed and built to test the surface effect concept. The first version of the XR-1 used fixed plywood seals at the fore and aft ends of the captured air bubble section. A jet engine providing 1700 pounds of thrust was used for main propulsion. A separate  gas engine was used to drive lift fans, and also to power out-drive units that were used for off-cushion slow-speed maneuvering. During the first year of testing, the XR-1 was fitted with more powerful main propulsion and flexible fore and aft seals were tested as well.

The XR-1 was also used to test the concept of water-jet propulsion. The ship was modified in 1964 and equipped with gas turbine engines driving the water jet propulsors. The ship's weight increased to 17 tons.

Rohr Industries 1970 to 1980 
Rohr Industries became involved in SES history in 1970, taking over the XR-1 test program for the Navy. Rohr continued to use the XR-1 to test propulsion and seal concepts. Their eventual goal was to develop a 3000-ton (3,050 tonne) SES, the LSES (Large Surface Effect Ship), capable of utilizing vertical launch missile systems and anti-submarine helicopters & various VTOL aircraft. The proposed ship was to be capable of 80 knots in sea-state 6 conditions. The proposed main power units were to be 4 40,000hp gas turbine engines driving water jet propulsors. The 3000-ton ship development contract was canceled in 1980.

The SES-100 

Two experimental SESs (the SES-100A and 100B), both of around 100 tons, with 80 ft (24 m) length and 40 ft (12 m) beams, were developed for the US Military in the 1960s and 70s. They both attained speeds in excess of the program goal of 80 knots (150 km/h). The SES 100B, was built by Bell Aerospace (Textron Corporation) at the NASA Michoud Assembly Facility. Driven by 2 semi-submerged, supercavitating controllable, reversible propellers, achieved speeds in excess of 96 knots (approximately 110 mph) in the Gulf outside St. Andrews Bay in Panama City, Florida.

The speed was verified by the USAF ARIS radar. It also fired the Navy's first vertically launched missile (an SM-2) while doing 60 knots (110 km/h). It was also used to test automatic ride control and high speed collision avoidance and navigation systems. The 100A ship was used to test waterjet propulsion, variable geometry inlets and automatic ride control systems. The 100A and 100B were both capable of operating almost completely out of the water on an air cushion with only 18in (46 cm) of sidewall, the propellers or the waterjet inlets entering the water. The 100-ton SES 100B was built for the US Navy as a 1/10 scale model to test the feasibility of using hovercraft and other Surface Effect Ships in combat situations. The top-secret specifications called for a ship capable of entering a combat zone at a speed of over 80 knots (150 km/h) and disgorging a tank and 100 soldiers onto a beach, turning back out onto water and escaping at high speed.

Unlike the hard sidewall SES's, the full skirted AALCs, JEFF A&B were the prototype vehicles for the LCAC's used by the Navy with such success in the Persian Gulf War.

The 3000-ton SES concept was never designed to go up on the beach, like a landing craft. The AALC (Amphibious Assault Landing Craft) and the SES were very different concepts from the beginning. The AALC was a pure hovercraft that is capable of high-speed insertion of troops and vehicles onto a beach. As a hovercraft, the LCAC, derived from the AALC has no rigid hull parts that extend past the air cushion. It therefore can operate across the beach. The SES has rigid side hulls that enclose the air cushion, permitting water propulsion but allowing it to only go to the shore when conducting amphibious operations. Design concepts for a 6000-plus-ton cargo SES's that Rohr and Ingalls Shipbuilding proposed relied on the idea of the ship loading and unloading from beach, lighter, causeway or conventional dock facilities.

On 10 November 1972 contracts were let to four firms to conduct 2200-ton prototype preliminary design; these designs were to be completed in August 1973. The prime contractors were Bell, Aerojet, Litton, and Lockheed.

Hovermarine SES Ferries
The UK based company Hovermarine developed the HM.2 SES ferry at their factory in Woolston, Southampton in the 1960s. The first HM-2 craft was operated by Seaspeed in 1968 between Ryde Pier and Portsmouth Harbour. The early HM2 suffered from mechanical problems and during a financial crisis in 1969, Hovermarine went into voluntary liquidation and the major assets were acquired by a new company, Hovermarine Transport Ltd, this was subsequently taken over by the American company, Transportation Technology Inc. Production of HM.2s for North and Central America was undertaken by Hovermarine's factory at Titusville, Florida. A brief trial of 2 HM.2 took place in Toronto from July to late fall 1974 to Niagara-on-the-Lake to Youngstown, New York. The service managed by Can-Am Hover Express used two craft, Toryoung I and Toryoung II, but an accident with the latter craft led to the demise of the service.

Over 110 HM.2's were manufactured in the United Kingdom and United States.

Japan 
In Japan, two type of SES were built: Kibou and Superliner Ogasawara.

Kibou was operated as a car ferry between Shimizu port and Shimoda port in Shizuoka prefecture. It was 2780-ton, 74m long with 2×MFT8(JT8D) engines. Vessel was decommissioned in 2005.

Superliner Ogasawara was planned to operate between Tokyo port and Ogasawara island in Tokyo prefecture, but it was cancelled because of high jet fuel cost in 2005. It stayed in Ishinomaki Port as a hotel ship for victims of the Tunami disaster in 2011. It was later scrapped in 2018. Vessel was 14500-ton, 140m long powered by 2×LM2500 engines

Operational use

Russia 

The Soviet Navy built two 1050-ton Bora class surface effect corvettes. The ships were passed on to the Russian Navy and remain in active service with the Black Sea Fleet.

Norway 
Umoe Mandal built 9 Alta and Oksøy class surface effect vessels for mine warfare for the Royal Norwegian Navy.

The Norwegian Navy also operates six Skjold class surface effect patrol boats. The prototype (KNM Skjold) was leased and tested for one year by the US Navy.

Sweden 
HSwMS Smyge, which acted as a small-scale pre-prototype testbed for the Visby-class corvette is now used as a training platform for Swedish Amphibious Corps Clearance divers.

See also 
 Air cavity system is a related technology.
 Ground-effect vehicle
 Aerodynamically alleviated marine vehicle
 List of amphibious warfare ships

References

External links
US Navy's SES-100B Surface Effect Ship

Air-cushion vehicles
Ship types
ja:地面効果翼機